Zheng Junfeng is a Chinese Sanda kickboxer, he currently competes in the Wu Lin Feng organization.

As of November 2021, he is ranked the #8 Super Bantamweight in the world by Combat Press.

Career
Zheng Junfeng was born in started practicing Sanda at the age of 8. He made his professional debut in 2009 as he was still participating in amateur competitions. In 2011 he placed 5th in the National Tournament.

Junfeng's first notable international victory came against the japanese champion Hirotaka Urabe who he beat by majority decision at Krush 77 on July 16, 2017.

On January 13, 2018 Junfeng faced Feng Liang for the vacant -60 kg Glory of Heroes title at the Glory of Heroes: Guangzhou event. He lost by unanimous decision.

In 2019 Junfeng joined the Wu Lin Feng organization, the next year he entered the Super Rookie Tournament. He won 4 fights in 3 months to reach the Final. On August 28, 2020 at Wu Lin Feng 2020: China New Kings Tournament Final Junfeng beat 
Wang Zhiwei for the Wu Lin Feng China New King title and the IPCC China -63 kg title. He won the fight by unanimous decision.

Titles and achievements

Wu Lin Feng
 2020 WLF China New King -63 kg Tournament Winner
International Professional Combat Council
 2020 IPCC China -63 kg Champion

Kickboxing record

|-  style="background:#cfc;"
| 2021-09-30 || Win|| align=left| Jin Ying || Wu Lin Feng 2021: World Contender League 6th Stage || Zhengzhou, China || Decision (Unanimous) || 3 || 3:00

|-  style="text-align:center; background:#cfc;"
| 2021-07-03 || Win|| align=left| Shun Li || Wu Lin Feng 2021: World Contender League 5th Stage || Zhengzhou, China || Decision (Unanimous) || 3 ||3:00

|-  style="text-align:center; background:#cfc;"
| 2021-03-27 || Win || align=left| Wang Zhiwei || Wu Lin Feng 2021: World Contender League 1st Stage || China || Ext.R Decision || 4 || 3:00

|-  style="text-align:center; background:#fbb;"
| 2021-01-23 || Loss || align=left| Wei Rui || Wu Lin Feng 2021: Global Kung Fu Festival || Macao, China || Decision (Unanimous) || 3||3:00

|- align="center"  bgcolor="#fbb"
| 2020-10-16 || Loss||align=left| Liu Wei || Wu Lin Feng 2020: China New Kings Champions Challenge || Hangzhou, China || Ext.R Decision (Split) || 4 || 3:00

|-  style="background:#cfc;"
| 2020-08-29 || Win|| align=left| Wang Zhiwei || Wu Lin Feng 2020: China New Kings Tournament Final || Zhengzhou, China || Decision (Unanimous) || 3 || 3:00
|-
! style=background:white colspan=9 |

|-  style="text-align:center; background:#cfc;"
| 2020-08-03 || Win || align=left| Zhang Jun || Wu Lin Feng 2020: King's Super Cup 4th Group Stage || Zhengzhou, China || Decision (Unanimous)|| 3 || 3:00

|-  style="background:#cfc;"
| 2020-07-05 || Win || align=left| Liu Chunrui || Wu Lin Feng 2020: King's Super Cup 3rd Group Stage || Zhengzhou, China || Decision (Unanimous)|| 3 || 3:00

|-  style="text-align:center; background:#cfc;"
| 2020-06-13 || Win || align=left| Jiduo Yibu || Wu Lin Feng 2020: King's Super Cup 2nd Group Stage || Zhengzhou, China || Decision (Unanimous)|| 3 || 3:00

|-  style="background:#CCFFCC;"
| 2020-05-15 || Win ||align=left| Wang Wanli || Wu Lin Feng 2020: King's Super Cup 1st Group Stage|| Zhengzhou, China || Decision (Unanimous) || 3 || 3:00

|-  style="background:#fbb;"
| 2019-11-30 || Loss || align=left| Ali Zanrifar || Wu Lin Feng 2019: WLF -67kg World Cup 2019-2020 6th Group Stage || Zhengzhou, China || Decision || 3 || 3:00

|-  style="text-align:center; background:#fbb;"
| 2019-09-28|| Loss||align=left| Daniel Puertas Gallardo || WLF -67kg World Cup 2019-2020 Contender Tournament Semi Final || Zhengzhou, China || Decision (Unanimous)|| 3 || 3:00

|-  style="background:#cfc;"
| 2018-10-20|| Win ||align=left| Vladyslav Melnyk ||Glory of Heroes 36: Ziyang|| Sichuan, China || Decision (Unanimous) || 3 || 3:00

|-  style="background:#fbb;"
| 2018-09-15|| Loss ||align=left| Yun Qi ||Glory of Heroes 34: Tongling|| Tongling, China || Decision (Unanimous) || 3 || 3:00

|-  style="background:#cfc;"
| 2018-07-28|| Win ||align=left| Thapanapong ||Glory of Heroes 33: Shanghai|| Shanghai, China || Decision (Unanimous) || 3 || 3:00

|-  style="background:#cfc;"
| 2018-03-03|| Win ||align=left| Craig Marshall Hughes ||Glory of Heroes: New Zealand vs China|| Auckland, New Zealand || TKO || 2||

|-  style="text-align:center; background:#fbb;"
| 2018-01-13 || Loss ||align=left| Feng Liang || Glory of Heroes: Guangzhou|| Guangzhou, China || Decision (Unanimous)|| 3 || 3:00
|-
! style=background:white colspan=9|

|-  style="background:#cfc;"
| 2017-09-23|| Win ||align=left| Li Ning ||Glory of Heroes: Luoyang|| Luoyang, China || Decision (Unanimous) || 3 || 3:00

|-  style="text-align:center; background:#cfc;"
| 2017-07-16|| Win ||align=left| Hirotaka Urabe || Krush.77 || Tokyo, Japan || Decision (Majority)|| 3 || 3:00

|-  style="background:#cfc;"
| 2017-03-25|| Win ||align=left| Abdullah Allev ||Rise of Heroes: Hengyang|| Hengyang, China || Decision (Unanimous) || 3 || 3:00

|-  style="text-align:center; background:#cfc;"
| 2016-01-23|| Win ||align=left| Kengo Maruta || || Xi'an, China || KO || 1 ||

|-  style="text-align:center; background:#cfc;"
| 2015-04-24|| Win ||align=left| Mark || Hua Wujue|| Changzhou, China || KO || 1 || 0:32

|-  style="text-align:center; background:#cfc;"
| 2015-01-31|| Win ||align=left| Sripana || Wu Lin Feng 2015 New Year Festival|| Chongqing, China || ||  ||

|-  style="text-align:center; background:#cfc;"
| 2015-01-24|| Win ||align=left| Krongching || Hua Wujue || Huiyang, China || ||  ||

|-  style="text-align:center; background:#cfc;"
| 2009-02-28|| Win ||align=left| Pan Ying Tang ||Wu Lin Feng China vs Vietnam || Zhengzhou, China || Decision || 3 || 3:00

|-
| colspan=9 | Legend:

Mixed martial arts record

|-
|Win
|align=center|10-2 (1)
| Benjamin Molnár
|Submission (guillotine choke)
|WKFCMC - MMA Bajnokság
|
|align=center|2
|align=center|
|Budapest, Hungary
|-
|Win
|align=center|9-2 (1)
| Abdelmoumen Mssaate
|Submission (guillotine choke)
|WKFCMC
|
|align=center|2
|align=center|
|Beijing, China
|
|-
|Loss
|align=center|8-2 (1)
| Abdulmutalip Gairbekov
|Decision (Unanimous)
|WLF E.P.I.C. 4
|
|align=center|3
|align=center|5:00
|Zhengzhou, China
|
|-
|Win
|align=center|8-1 (1)
| Huang Jie
|Decision 
|Hanfeng Wuhun
|
|align=center|2
|align=center|
|Beijing, China
|
|-
|NC
|align=center|7-1 (1)
| Shooto Watanabe
|
|WLF E.P.I.C. 2
|
|align=center|2
|align=center|3:00
|Zhengzhou, China
|Originally a second round TKO win for Junfeng later overturned to a no contest.
|-
|Win
|align=center|7-1
| Wei Chengjin
|Submission (leg lock)
|WKFCMC
|
|align=center|
|align=center|
|Beijing, China
|
|-
|Win
|align=center|6-1
| Artur Kascheev
|TKO (punches)
|WLF E.P.I.C. 1
|
|align=center|3
|align=center|5:00
|Zhengzhou, China
|-
|Win
|align=center|5-1
| Zhou Jianyang
|Submission (armbar)
|
|
|align=center|1
|align=center|0:30
|China
|
|-
|Win
|align=center|4-1
| Liu Ji Kang
|Decision 
|Hanfeng Wuhun
|
|align=center|3
|align=center|5:00
|Xuzhou, China
|
|-
|Win
|align=center|3-1
| Mike
|TKO
|China Mixed Fight Alliance
|
|align=center|1
|align=center|2:50
|Xuchang, China
|
|-
|Loss
|align=center|2-1
| Liang Yang
|Submission (armbar)
|RUFF 7
|
|align=center|2
|align=center|4:41
|Nanjing, Jiangsu, China
|
|-
|Win
|align=center|2-0
| Juncheng Wen
|Decision 
|RUFF 6
|
|align=center|3
|align=center|5:00
|Hohhot, Inner Mongolia, China
|
|-
|Win
|align=center|1-0
| Li Zaihao
|Decision 
|Shaanxi Ultimate Fighting Tournament
|
|align=center|
|align=center|
|Shaanxi, China
|

|-
|Win
|align=center|3-0
| Zheng Boqie
|Submission (Armbar)
|
|
|align=center|1
|align=center|
|China
|Final
|-
|Win
|align=center|2-0
| Bai Juzheng
|Submission (Guillotine choke)
|
|
|align=center|
|align=center|
|China
|Semi Final
|-
|Win
|align=center|1-0
| Gu Wenzhen
|Decision (Unanimous)
|
|
|align=center|
|align=center|
|China
|Quarter Final

Mixed rules record

|-
| 
| align=center| 0–1
|  Xiao Long
| TKO (Hand injury)
| Huya Kung Fu Carnival 4
| 
| align=center|2
| align=center|3:00
| Zhengzhou, China
| 
|-

See also
 List of male kickboxers

References 

Chinese male kickboxers
1997 births
Living people
People from Zhoukou
Sportspeople from Henan
Chinese sanshou practitioners
Chinese male mixed martial artists
Mixed martial artists utilizing sanshou